Established in 1991, the Eastern Collegiate Hockey Association is a hockey-only college athletic conference whose members are East Coast schools.  The ECHA is part of the American Collegiate Hockey Association Division 1.

League Format
ECHA members play each conference opponent twice, once at home and once away. In addition teams play non-league games against other ACHA member schools. At the conclusion of the regular season in February the league holds a championship tournament. At the conclusion of the ECHA championship tournament, the ECHA regular season champions receive an automatic bid to the ACHA Men's Division I National Tournament.

League History
The ECHA is currently composed of eight member institutions: George Mason, Villanova, Temple, William Paterson, The United States Naval Academy, Towson, Lehigh, and West Chester. The 2012/2013, 2013/2014, and 2015/2016 regular season titles were won by Navy; they also won the postseason tournament in 2013.

Previous members include Lebanon Valley College who ended ECHA competition with the 2012 season. In the 2014/2015 season the University of Scranton folded their hockey program bringing the current number of members to 6. Also in 2014/2015 Drexel won its fifth ECHA tournament championship 10–3 against Towson, while Villanova won the regular season title. Drexel goalie Zach Kanter was named ECHA tournament MVP in 2015. In effort to maintain the conferences automatic bid to the National Championship Tournament, the ECHA welcomed Temple University beginning in 2015/2016. That same year the Naval Academy took home the regular season championship.

The ECHA tournament champion is awarded the A.J. Ruth Memorial Cup.
.

ECHA Championship History

Member Institutions

Conference arenas

Former members

External links 
Official ECHA Site

See also
American Collegiate Hockey Association
List of ice hockey leagues

ACHA Division 1 conferences
Ice hockey in Maryland
1991 establishments in the United States